Thorndon is a historic inner suburb of Wellington, the capital city of New Zealand. Because the suburb is relatively level compared to the hilly terrain elsewhere in Wellington it contained Wellington's elite residential area until its best was destroyed in the 1960s by a new motorway and the erection of tall office buildings on the sites of its Molesworth Street retail and service businesses.

Before Thorndon was Thorndon it was Haukawakawa and in 1824 Pipitea Pā was settled at its southern end. More recently Pipitea Marae and the land under the Government Centre have been separated from Thorndon and the name Pipitea returned to them in 2003. The reclamations have been included in the new suburb Pipitea.

Thorndon combines the home of government and upmarket residential accommodation. It is located at the northern end of the Central Business District.

History

Pipitea has been said to have been named for the pipi beds along Thorndon Quay.

Ngāti Mutunga from Taranaki established the fortified village, Pipitea Pā, in 1824 on the Haukawakawa flats. Then the Ngāti Mutunga left on the sailing ship Rodney in 1835 settling in the Chatham Islands and Te Āti Awa occupied the pā. The pā declined after European settlement though some people remained there into the 20th century. There were other villages near 191 Thorndon Quay and near the junction of Hobson Street with Fitzherbert Terrace. The Pā's gardens reached parliament grounds and the Botanic Garden.

Part of the pā site opened in 1980 as an urban marae. The site transferred to Te Āti Awa/Taranaki whānui as part of the local Treaty Settlement in 2009.

Pipitea Marae and its meeting house, Te Upoko o te Ika a Māui, is a meeting place for Taranaki Whānui ki te Upoko o te Ika and Te Āti Awa.

Thorndon, like Te Aro, is one of the few comparatively flat areas on the harbour. Haukawakawa / Thorndon flats became a significant part of Port Nicholson's first organised European settlement in 1840. S C Brees described it in 1848 as "the court end of town". European settlers built their houses alongside the Maori settlement of Pipitea and the New Zealand Company named all the flats Thorndon after the estate of W H F Petre one of their directors.

Demographics 

Thorndon had a population of 4,020 at the 2018 New Zealand census, an increase of 333 people (9.0%) since the 2013 census, and an increase of 543 people (15.6%) since the 2006 census. There were 1,860 households. There were 1,923 males and 2,097 females, giving a sex ratio of 0.92 males per female. The median age was 32.9 years (compared with 37.4 years nationally), with 312 people (7.8%) aged under 15 years, 1,443 (35.9%) aged 15 to 29, 1,833 (45.6%) aged 30 to 64, and 432 (10.7%) aged 65 or older.

Ethnicities were 79.0% European/Pākehā, 6.9% Māori, 2.5% Pacific peoples, 17.2% Asian, and 3.7% other ethnicities (totals add to more than 100% since people could identify with multiple ethnicities).

The proportion of people born overseas was 36.6%, compared with 27.1% nationally.

Although some people objected to giving their religion, 55.1% had no religion, 29.9% were Christian, 3.1% were Hindu, 1.3% were Muslim, 1.7% were Buddhist and 4.0% had other religions.

Of those at least 15 years old, 2,193 (59.1%) people had a bachelor or higher degree, and 114 (3.1%) people had no formal qualifications. The median income was $52,900, compared with $31,800 nationally. The employment status of those at least 15 was that 2,469 (66.6%) people were employed full-time, 435 (11.7%) were part-time, and 129 (3.5%) were unemployed.

Notable buildings
The buildings of the New Zealand Parliament are located in Thorndon. Thorndon is also the location of national institutions including the Appeal and High Courts —the Supreme Court is on Lambton Quay facing Parliament— the National Library and Archives New Zealand.

The national museum moved from behind Parliament in Museum Street to a much larger purpose-built building in Buckle Street just before the second world war then in 1998 to the harbour edge and is now Te Papa Tongarewa.

Thorndon is home to two Cathedrals: the Anglican St Paul's Cathedral built between 1937 and 1998 to replace the pro-cathedral now known as Old St Paul's, which in turn had replaced a church on the site of the Beehive in 1844; and the Roman Catholic Sacred Heart Cathedral in Hill Street, opened in 1901 to replace the destroyed St Mary's Cathedral in Eccleston Hill dating from 1851.

The Thistle Inn is one of New Zealand's oldest pubs.

Geographic boundaries

Thorndon occupies the northern end of the narrow coastal plain that makes up the heart of Wellington. It is flanked to the north by the green hills of Wadestown, by Northland and Kelburn to the west and south, and on its south Pipitea with the Government Centre, the marae and to its east the port facilities of Wellington Harbour. Thorndon now incorporates Te Ahumairangi Hill.

The boundaries of Thorndon form a very rough triangle.  Starting from the triangle's lower south-west corner, at the intersection of Glenmore Street and Collins Terrace, the boundary goes up through the north side of Te Ahumairangi Hill right across to Wadestown's Weld Street and down to the north end of Frandi Street.  Then the boundary follows the west side of Thorndon Quay down until Davis Street where it zig-zags through to Hill Street then over to Bowen Street, Tinakori Road and Glenmore Street up to its junction with Collins Terrace.

Parks and gardens
Queen's Park was created to commemorate Queen Victoria's Diamond Jubilee in 1897. It is bounded by Grant Road, Wadestown Road and Park Road. There is a fountain and planted garden at the intersection of Grant Road and Wadestown Road. Trees in the park are a mixture of natives and exotics including a stand of oak trees. The Magyar Millenium Park, commonly known as the Hungarian garden, is on the corner of Molesworth Street and Hawkestone Street. It was built in 2003, although it was planned to be opened in 2000 to mark the millennium of Hungary being a Christian state. It is the only Hungarian monument in New Zealand. It incorporates a paved area, seating, planted garden beds, a carved gate and memorial plaques. The Katherine Mansfield Memorial Park in Fitzherbert Terrace is dedicated to the writer Katherine Mansfield. It was created in the late 1960s when the urban motorway was built and incorporates the Lady McKenzie Garden for the Blind.

Gallery

Education

Schools located in Thorndon include Wellington Girls' College, St Mary's College, Queen Margaret College and primary schools Thorndon School and Sacred Heart Cathedral School.

The Central Regional Health School, a hospital school, is located in Thorndon.

Events 

Thorndon Farmers Market is set up each Saturday in Hill Street.

The Thorndon Fair is held annually, usually on the first Sunday of December. The fair has many stalls selling crafts and second-hand goods and is held for the benefit of Thorndon School. It has taken place for many years and is one of the main community events held in Thorndon. Parts of Tinakori Road and Hill Street are closed during the fair.

Thorndon's Sky Stadium is one of New Zealand's top sports venues. The Thorndon Tennis (and Squash) Club, established in the 19th century, is one of the oldest in the world.

Notable residents

Ex officio
 Governor-General at Bowen Street from 1871 to 1907 on what is now the site of the Beehive
 Prime Minister at 260 Tinakori Road
 Speaker
 Anglican Bishop of Wellington
 Catholic Archbishop of Wellington and Metropolitan of New Zealand

Private citizens

Hobson Street
 Charles Abraham (bishop of Wellington)
 Charles Barron
 Harold Beauchamp #8
 Alfred Brandon (politician)
 Alfred Brandon (mayor)
 Alfred Brandon (lawyer)
 William Henry Clayton

 Charles Clifford
 John Duncan (1839–1919) now the site of the Australian High Commission
 Robert Hart (politician)
 Charles Beard Izard
 Walter Woods Johnston #6
 Jacob Joseph (merchant)
 Arthur Myers, Cabinet Minister
 Evelyn Margaret Page #20
 Robert Pharazyn merchant and runholder
 William Pharazyn merchant and runholder
 Robert Stains
 Thomas Coldham Williams (1825–1912) runholder now Queen Margaret College

Tinakori Road

 Harold Beauchamp #25 and 133
 Elsdon Best
 Isaac Featherston land now Newman Terrace
 George Hunter (mayor)
 Nathaniel Levin merchant
 William Levin merchant and runholder now Pendennis, #15 Burnell Avenue
 Douglas Lilburn #22 Ascot Street
 Katherine Mansfield
 Andrew Todd (New Zealand)

Fitzherbert Terrace
 John Johnston (New Zealand politician) merchant and runholder, driveway Katherine Avenue, Queen Margaret College and Thorndon tennis club courts
 Harold Beauchamp #47

Hawkestone Street and Portland Crescent
 Joseph Nathan merchant, founded Glaxo now GlaxoSmithKline

Hill Street
 Charles Hayward Izard #21
 Jonas Woodward

Sydney Street West
 Rita Angus #194a

Bowen Street
 Alexander Turnbull #25
 Bowen Street Hospital

Murphy Street
 Arthur Donald Stuart Duncan
 Robin Cooke took the suburb's name when raised to a life peerage

Thorndon Quay
 George Friend

Glenmore Street

Many embassies, high commissions and consulates are located in Thorndon including: the US, Chinese, Cuban, German, Italian, Philippine, Thai and Turkish Embassies; the Australian, British, Canadian, Cook Islands, Fijian, Indian, and Niue High Commissions; and the Norwegian and Swedish Consulates-General.

Thorndon Esplanade

"Wellington's Show Walk". Thorndon Esplanade with its baths and shrubs lies beneath Aotea Quay. Its band rotunda was sent to Central Park in 1921. Built at the end of the 1880s on the reclamation of the Manawatu Railway Company and intended to be a place of fashionable display it did not survive the first World War. It had become dirty and disreputable suffering from the increased activity in the smoky railway yards alongside. Its coprosmas and "gallant pohutukawas" never grew larger seeming to lack any care from the City Council but the wind and the poor soil and the grimy railway yard discouraged plants and visitors. "Lovers seemed to monopolise the gardens in the evenings".

The salt water baths were closed in 1920 and the superstructure moved to Evans Bay for dressing sheds. New baths opened in Murphy Street in November 1924 with certain hours set aside for mixed bathing.

Notes

References

External links

Archives New Zealand
National Library
Thorndon History by Jeremy Lowe

Suburbs of Wellington City